The 2018 IIHF Women's U18 World Championship was the 11th Women's U18 World Championship in ice hockey. It was played at the Ice Palace in Dmitrov, Russia from 6 to 13 January 2018. The USA won for the seventh time, for the first time defeating someone other than Canada in the gold medal game. Sweden took silver, while Canada took bronze beating host Russia. The Russians beat Canada in the preliminary round, marking another first.

On 4 January 2018, the Ice Hockey Federation of Russia announced that all entry tickets would be free as part of their program.

Top Division

Preliminary round
All times are local (UTC+3).

Group A

Group B

Relegation round
The third and fourth placed team from Group B will play a best-of-three series to determine the relegated team.

Final round

Bracket

Quarterfinals

Semifinals

Fifth place game

Bronze medal game

Gold medal game

Final ranking

Tournament awards
Most Valuable Player

 Taylor Heise

All-star team
 Goaltender:  Anna Amholt
 Defencemen:  Maja Nylén Persson,  Alexie Guay
 Forwards:  Taylor Heise,  Ilona Markova,  Markenna Webster
Source: IIHF.com

Best players selected by the directorate
 Best Goalkeeper  Anna Amholt
 Best Defenseman  Gracie Ostertag
 Best Forward  Taylor Heise
Source: IIHF.com

Statistics

Scoring leaders

GP = Games played; G = Goals; A = Assists; Pts = Points; +/− = Plus-minus; PIM = Penalties In MinutesSource: IIHF.com

Goaltending leaders
(minimum 40% team's total ice time)

TOI = Time On Ice (minutes:seconds); GA = Goals against; GAA = Goals against average; Sv% = Save percentage; SO = ShutoutsSource: IIHF.com

Division I

Division I A
The Group A tournament was held in Asiago, Italy from 8 to 14 January 2018. Having just been relegated to Division I in 2017, Japan entered the tournament with something to prove, handily winning all five matches in regulation and reclaiming their place in the Top Division. Despite eking out a shootout win against Hungary, Norway amassed the fewest points and were relegated to Division I Group B.

Best players selected by the directorate
 Best Goalkeeper:  Ena Nystrøm
 Best Defenseman:  Nadia Mattivi
 Best Forward:  Theresa Schafzahl
Source: IIHF.com

Best players of each team selected by the coaches

  Leoni Geifes (D)
  Míra Seregély (F)
  Nadia Mattivi (D)
  Remi Koyama (F)
  Ena Nystrøm (G)
  Lívia Kúbeková (F)

Source: IIHF.com

Statistics

Scoring leaders

GP = Games played; G = Goals; A = Assists; Pts = Points; +/− = Plus-minus; PIM = Penalties in minutesSource: IIHF.com

Goaltending leaders
(minimum 40% team's total ice time)

TOI = Time on ice (minutes:seconds); GA = Goals against; GAA = Goals against average; Sv% = Save percentage; SO = ShutoutsSource: IIHF.com

Division I B
The Group B tournament was held in Katowice, Poland from 6 to 12 January 2018. Denmark won the tournament with a +27 goal difference and were promoted to Division I Group A. With only one point earned in five games, Australia was relegated to Division I Group B Qualification.

Danish defenceman Amanda Refsgaard was the highest scoring player of the tournament, notching 4 goals and 6 assists. Seven of the highest scoring players were Danish, including all five of the top ranked players. The leading scorer from a team other than Denmark was forward Elise Lombard of France, who ranked sixth overall with 4 goals and 2 assists.

Denmark also topped the charts on the goaltending front, with goaltenders Martine Terrida and Emma-Sofie Nordström ranking first and second in both goals against average (GAA) and save percentage (Sv%). Goaltender Martyna Sass of Poland recorded the highest time on ice at 258 minutes, nearly fifteen minutes more than any other goaltender at the tournament.

Best players selected by the directorate
 Best Goalkeeper:  Martyna Sass
 Best Defenseman:  Amanda Refsgaard
 Best Forward  Elise Lombard
Source: IIHF.com

Best players of each team selected by the coaches

  Emily Davis-Tope (F)
  Fu Chunyang (D)
  Julie Oksbjerg (F)
  Justine Crousy Theode (G)
  Jemma Wallis (D)
  Alicja Wcislo (D)

Source: IIHF.com

Statistics

Scoring leaders

GP = Games played; G = Goals; A = Assists; Pts = Points; +/− = Plus-minus; PIM = Penalties in minutesSource: IIHF.com

Goaltending leaders
(minimum 40% team's total ice time)

TOI = Time on ice (minutes:seconds); GA = Goals against; GAA = Goals against average; Sv% = Save percentage; SO = ShutoutsSource: IIHF.com

Division I B qualification
The Group B Qualification tournament was held in Mexico City, Mexico from 30 January to 4 February 2018. The Netherlands won promotion to Division I Group B.

Best players selected by the directorate
 Best Goalkeeper:  Emma Fondse
 Best Defenseman:  Romy Brouwers
 Best Forward:  Joanna Rojas
Source: IIHF.com

Best players of each team selected by the coaches

  Marta Martín (D)
  Zhanel Kozgulova (D)
  Joanna Rojas (F)
  Maree Dijkema (F)
  Melisa Figenli (F)

Source: IIHF.com

Statistics

Scoring leaders

GP = Games played; G = Goals; A = Assists; Pts = Points; +/− = Plus-minus; PIM = Penalties in minutesSource: IIHF.com

Goaltending leaders
(minimum 40% team's total ice time)

TOI = Time on ice (minutes:seconds); GA = Goals against; GAA = Goals against average; Sv% = Save percentage; SO = ShutoutsSource: IIHF.com

References

IIHF World Women's U18 Championships
2017–18 in Russian ice hockey
2017–18 in women's ice hockey
2018 in Russian women's sport
International ice hockey competitions hosted by Russia
Ice hockey in Moscow Oblast
IIHF World Women's U18